Stewart or Stuart McKinney  may refer to:

Stewart McKinney (politician) (1931–1987), American politician
Stewart McKinney (rugby player) (born 1946), former Ireland international rugby union player
Stewart McKinney (crew chief), former American NASCAR Cup Series crew chief in 1963 Western North Carolina 500
Stuart McKinney (Ugly Betty), a character on the TV series Ugly Betty